Sheikhupura is a city in Punjab, Pakistan.

Sheikhupura may also refer to:
Sheikhupura District, a district of Punjab (Pakistan)
Sheikhupura Tehsil, a tehsil of district Sheikhupura
Sheikhupura Fort, a Mughal-era fort
Sheikhupura cricket team, a cricket team

See also
 Sheikhpura, a city in Bihar, India
 Sheikhpur (disambiguation), several villages